Darko is a common South Slavic masculine given name. It is derived from the Slavic root dar 'gift'. Its oldest mention is from the 14th century, included in the Dečani chrysobulls (1330).

Notable people

 Darko Angelov, Macedonian diplomat
 Darko Anić (chess player) (born 1957), Croatian chess grandmaster
 Darko Anić (footballer) (born 1974), Serbian footballer
 Darko Balaban (born 1989), Serbian basketball player
 Darko Belojević (born 1960), Yugoslav-Serbian footballer and coach
 Darko Bodul (born 1989), Bosnian-Croatian footballer
 Darko Bošković (born 1987), Montenegrin footballer
 Darko Božović (born 1978), Montenegrin footballer
 Darko Brašanac (born 1992), Serbian footballer
 Darko Bratina (1942–1997), Italian sociologist and politician
 Darko Brljak (born 1984), Slovenian footballer
 Darko Butorović (born 1970), Croatian footballer
 Darko Čeferin (born 1968), Slovenian football referee
 Darko Čordaš (born 1976), Serbian footballer
 Donnie Darko (born 1977), Living Receiver, Destroyer of Tangent Universe
 Darko Damjanovski (born 1981), Macedonian skier
 Darko Dimitrov (born 1973), Macedonian record producer
 Darko Djukič (born 1980), Slovenian footballer
 Darko Djurdjević (born 1987), Serbian footballer
 Darko Domijan (born 1952), Yugoslav-Croatian singer
 Darko Dražić (born 1963), Yugoslav-Croatian footballer and coach
 Darko Drinić (born 1981), Serbian footballer
 Darko Dunjić (born 1981), Serbian footballer
 Darko Fejsa (born 1987), Serbian footballer
 Darko Filipović (born 1981), Serbian singer
 Darko Franić (born 1987), Croatian footballer
 Darko Glišić (born 1991), Macedonian footballer
 Darko Grubor (born 1962), Serbian sports executive
 Darko Horvat (born 1973), Croatian footballer
 Darko Janacković (born 1967), Serbian-French football coach
 Darko Jelčić (born 1965), Yugoslav drummer
 Darko Jevtić (born 1993), Swiss footballer
 Darko Jovandić (born 1982), Serbian footballer
 Darko Jozinović (born 1970), Croatian footballer
 Darko Karadžić (born 1989), Montenegrin footballer
 Darko Karapetrovič (born 1976), Slovenian footballer
 Darko Kolić (born 1971), Serbian footballer
 Darko Kovačević (born 1973), Serbian footballer
 Darko Kralj (born 1971), Croatian Paralympic shot putter
 Darko Krsteski (born 1971), Macedonian footballer
 Darko Lazić (singer) (born 1991), Serbian singer
 Darko Lazić (footballer) (born 1994), Serbian footballer
 Darko Lazović (born 1990), Serbian footballer
 Darko Ljubojević (born 1975), Bosnian footballer
 Darko Lovrić (born 1980), Serbian footballer
 Darko Lukanović (born 1984), Yugoslav-Swedish footballer
 Darko Macan (born 1966), Croatian author and illustrator
 Darko Maletić (born 1980), Bosnian footballer
 Darko Marić (born 1975), Serbian footballer
 Darko Marković (born 1987), Montenegrin footballer
 Darko Martinović (born 1982), Bosnian handballer
 Darko Matić (born 1980), Bosnian footballer
 Darko Matijašević (born 1968), Bosnian Serb politician
 Darko Mavrak (born 1969), Yugoslav footballer
 Darko Maver, a fictional Yugoslav artist invented as a hoax
 Darko Micevski (born 1992), Macedonian footballer
 Darko Miladin (born 1979), Croatian footballer
 Darko Milanič (born 1967), Slovenian footballer
 Darko Miličić (born 1985), Serbian basketball player
 Darko Milinović (born 1963), Croatian politician
 Darko Mitrevski (born 1971), Macedonian film director
 Darko Nestorović (born 1965), Bosnian footballer and coach
 Darko Pahlić (born 1963), Croatian basketball player
 Darko Pančev (born 1965), Macedonian footballer
 Darko Pavićević (born 1986), Montenegrin footballer
 Darko Perić (born 1978), Croatian footballer
 Darko Perović (born 1965), Serbian comic-book artist and writer
 Darko Pivaljević (born 1975), Serbian footballer
 Darko Planinić (born 1990), Croatian basketball player
 Darko Raca (born 1977), Bosnian footballer
 Darko Raić-Sudar (born 1972), Croatian footballer
 Darko Rakočević (born 1981), Serbian footballer
 Darko Ramovš (born 1973), Serbian footballer and sporting executive
 Darko F. Ribnikar (died 1914), Serbian journalist
 Darko Rundek (born 1956), Croatian singer-songwriter
 Darko Šarović (born 1990), Serbian sprinter
 Darko Savić (born 1979), Serbian footballer
 Darko Sokolov (born 1986), Macedonian basketball player
 Darko Spalević (born 1977), Serbian footballer
 Darko Stanić (born 1978), Serbian handball player
 Darko Šuškavčević (born 1974), Montenegrin footballer
 Darko Suvin (born 1930), Croatian-Canadian academic and literary critic
 Darko Tasevski (born 1984), Macedonian footballer
 Darko Tešović (born 1970), Serbian footballer
 Darko Tofiloski (born 1986), Macedonian footballer
 Darko Vargec (born 1972), Yugoslav-Serbian footballer and manager
 Darko Vujović (born 1962), Montenegrin footballer
 Darko Vukašinović (born 1985), Montenegrin footballer
 Darko Vukić (born 1968), Croatian footballer
 Darko Zec (born 1989), Slovenian footballer
 Darko Živanović (born 1987), Serbian long-distance runner

See also
 Darko (disambiguation)

References

Croatian masculine given names
Serbian masculine given names
Slovene masculine given names
Macedonian masculine given names
Bulgarian masculine given names